The 1946 Dickinson Red and White football team was an American football team that represented Dickinson College as an independent during the 1946 college football season. In their first year under head coach Ralph Ricker, the Red Devils compiled a 6–1 record and outscored opponents by a total of 115 to 51. It was Dickinson's first season of college football since 1942, the program having been suspended during World War II. It was also the program's most successful season since the unbeaten 1937 season.

Schedule

References

Dickinson
Dickinson Red Devils football seasons
Dickinson Red and White football